Pseudeuclea cribrosa is a species of beetle in the family Cerambycidae. It was described by Bernhard Schwarzer in 1931. It is known from Borneo.

References

Pteropliini
Beetles described in 1931